Law enforcement in Pakistan is one of the three main components of the criminal justice system of Pakistan, alongside the judiciary and the prisons.
The country has a mix of federal, provincial and territorial police forces with both general and specialised functions, but the senior ranks of all the provincial forces and most of the federal ones are manned by members of the Police Service of Pakistan (PSP). The PSP is one of the most prestigious parts of the Central Superior Services, Pakistan's main civil service organisation. Federal law enforcement agencies are generally overseen by the Ministry of Interior of the Government of Pakistan, while provincial police forces are overseen by a department of the government of that province.

Federal police agencies
Some of the below agencies are part of the Civil Armed Forces, while others are law enforcement divisions of government departments. Not included is the Pakistan Army Corps of Military Police, which only has jurisdiction over military personnel.

 Airports Security Force (8,945 personnel) is part of the Aviation Division (which also includes Pakistan International Airlines, and the Pakistan Civil Aviation Authority) and is responsible for protecting airports, facilities and the planes (on-ground or in-air). It safeguards the civil aviation industry against unlawful interferences, adopting counter terrorism measures, preventing crime and maintaining law and order within the limits of Pakistani airports.

 Anti-Narcotics Force (3,100 personnel) is tasked with combating narcotics smuggling and use within Pakistan.

 Directorate General of Intelligence and Investigation is the investigation branch of the Federal Board of Revenue.

 Federal Investigation Agency is a border control, counter-intelligence and security agency under the Interior Ministry, tasked with investigative jurisdiction on undertaking operations against terrorism, espionage, federal crimes, fascism, smuggling as well as infringement and other specific crimes.

 The four Frontier Corps (80,000 personnel) are paramilitary forces operating along the Afghanistan-Pakistan border and Iran-Pakistan border, sometimes given police powers of arrest and detention.

 Frontier Constabulary (26,000 personnel) is a paramilitary police force responsible for maintaining law and order and dealing with situations outside the capabilities of the civilian police force of the province of Khyber Pakhtunkhwa. It was founded in the British Empire in 1913, and was named after the former North-West Frontier Province.

 Gilgit Baltistan Scouts (2,481 personnel) is a paramilitary force operating in the northernmost parts of Pakistan along the China-Pakistan border.

 The National Counter Terrorism Authority (NACTA) is a coordination and planning body bringing together many organisations whose remits cover counter-terrorism. They are responsible for domestic and international liaison, creating short and long term strategies and action plans, and carrying out research with the aim of countering terrorism.

 National Highways and Motorway Police is responsible for enforcement of traffic and safety laws, security and recovery on the National Highways and Motorway network. The NH&MP use SUVs, cars and heavy motorbikes for patrols, and speed cameras for enforcing speed limits.

 National Police Academy is a training centre for the senior officers of civilian police agencies.

 National Police Bureau acts as a think tank for the Ministry of Interior to shape police reforms and policies.

 Pakistan Coast Guard (7,000 personnel) is a paramilitary force operating along the coast of Pakistan.

 Pakistan Railways Police operates on the railway system of Pakistan.

 The Punjab Rangers and the Sindh Rangers (41,000 personnel in total) are paramilitary forces operating along the India-Pakistan border, often given temporary police powers.

 Pakistan Customs operates in the airports and seaports of Pakistan.

Islamabad Capital Territory 
The Capital Territory Police is the ordinary police force for the Islamabad Capital Territory. Because of the city's status, its police force is under the remit of the Government of Pakistan. It includes the Islamabad Traffic Police.

Provincial and territorial police

The four provinces of Pakistan (Punjab, Khyber Pakhtunkhwa, Sindh and Balochistan) each have their own police force, organised to suit the challenges of that locality, with their own specialised and elite units. Each police force has a Commissioner of Police appointed as Inspector-General who is a senior officer from the Police Service of Pakistan. Some provincial police forces are routinely supported by federal paramilitary units operating in that area. All provincial police forces contain a Counter Terrorism Department. 

The traditional uniform of Pakistani provincial police officers is a black shirt with tan trousers. In 2017, police in Punjab transitioned to an olive green uniform, but reverted to the traditional uniform in 2019. In 2020, all provinces decided to adopt the uniform worn in Islamabad - light blue or white shirts with dark blue trousers.

Balochistan 

 The Balochistan Police (38,000 personnel) operates in 7 districts of Balochistan province.

 The Balochistan Constabulary (10,000 personnel) is a reserve police unit of the Balochistan Police.

 The Balochistan Levies (23,000 personnel) is a paramilitary police force operating in 23 of Balochistan's 30 districts.

Khyber Pakhtunkhwa 

 The Khyber Pakhtunkhwa Police (83,000 personnel) is the main civilian police force in Khyber Pakhtunkhwa province.

 The Reserve Frontier Police (10,000 personnel) acts as the reserve unit of the KP Police.

 The Special Combat Unit is for counter-terrorism operations.

 The Khasadar Forces are tribal security forces operating throughout the former tribal areas, now part of Khyber Pakhtunkhwa.

 Khyber Pakhtunkhwa Levies (11,739 personnel) are raised by provincial or local governments to provide additional security in their areas. They include:
 Dir Levies
 Malakand Levies

The Levies and the Khasadar Forces will be absorbed into the Khyber Pakhtunkhwa Police.

Punjab 

 The Punjab Police (180,000 personnel) operates in the Punjab province.
 The Dolphin Force deals with street crime.
 The Elite Police performs counter-terrorism operations.
 The Police Qaumi Razakars are a support force for the Punjab Police in their duties. 

 Punjab Highway Patrol

 Punjab Prisons manage 43 prisons.

Sindh 

 The Sindh Police (128,500 personnel) operates in the Sindh province.
 The Special Security Unit is a specialized counterterrorism and security unit, based in Karachi, with operational jurisdiction extending throughout Sindh. The SSU was established in 2010 in response to increased rates of terrorism.

Territories 
The Azad Kashmir Police operates in the semi-autonomous Azad Kashmir. The Gilgit-Baltistan Police operates in the semi-autonomous Gilgit-Baltistan region.

Police Service of Pakistan

The Police Service of Pakistan (PSP) replaced the Indian Imperial Police in 1948, a year after Pakistan became independent from the British Raj. The service commands and provides leadership to federal, provincial, and territorial police forces. Its officers are assigned to different districts, provinces and stations across Pakistan. Most of the country's highest profile law enforcement positions are staffed by members of the PSP, including Inspector Generals of provinces, the Director Generals of the Intelligence Bureau and Federal Investigation Agency, and superintendents of the Frontier Constabulary & National Highways and Motorway Police. Officers are recruited through an extremely competitive examination held once a year by the Federal Public Service Commission. Those selected then must undergo a six month training programme known as CTP at the Civil Services Academy (CSA) in Lahore, and a further 18 months of specialised training occurs at the National Police Academy Islamabad. 

Primarily operated through the four provincial governments and the Islamabad Capital Territory, each police service has a jurisdiction extending only within the relevant province or territory. 

The law enforcement agencies are also involved in providing first response to emergencies and other threats to public safety as well as protecting the infrastructure and maintaining order in the country. Apart from investigating crime scenes, criminal acts, suspected unlawful activities, and detention of suspected criminals pending judicial action, the law enforcement agencies (primarily police) also perform duties that include the service and enforcement of warrants, writs, and other orders of the courts.

Designations of PSP officers

See also
Federal Security Force, a defunct law enforcement agency
Civil Armed Forces
List of cases of law enforcement brutality in Pakistan
Crime in Pakistan
Organised crime in Pakistan

References